Frankford Transportation Center (also known as Frankford Terminal and Bridge-Pratt station) is a transportation terminal in Frankford, Philadelphia, Pennsylvania, United States. It was once known as the Bridge Street terminal before a complete reconstruction in 2003. Frankford Transportation Center is the last stop for the Market-Frankford Line trains before heading westbound for 69th Street Transportation Center.

Overview 
Besides being the depot and terminus for many bus routes, it is the eastern terminus of the Market-Frankford Line (MFL) (also called the Market-Frankford Subway-Elevated Line (MFSE), the El, or the Blue Line), a subway-elevated rapid transit line in Philadelphia, Pennsylvania, run by SEPTA, which begins at 69th Street Transportation Center just west of the Philadelphia city line in Upper Darby Township and runs mostly over and under Philadelphia streets to its terminus at the Frankford Transportation Center.

Station layout

Gallery

References

External links 

 SEPTA – Frankford Transportation Center map (archived)
 Images at NYCSubway.org
 

SEPTA Market-Frankford Line stations
SEPTA stations and terminals
Railway stations in Philadelphia
Historic American Engineering Record in Philadelphia
Railway stations in the United States opened in 1918
1918 establishments in Pennsylvania